Hatchet Lake Denesuline Nation is a Denesuline First Nation in northern Saskatchewan. The main settlement, Wollaston Lake, is an unincorporated community on Wollaston Lake in the boreal forest of north-eastern Saskatchewan, Canada. 

The population centre comprises the northern settlement of Wollaston Lake, an unincorporated community in the Northern Saskatchewan Administration District, and the adjoining First Nations community of Wollaston Post, the administrative headquarters of the Hatchet Lake Dene First Nation band government.

Access is provided by Wollaston Lake Airport and Highway 905. With the highway on the west side of the lake and the community on the east, cccess from the highway is provided by an ice road in the winter and by the Wollaston Barge Ferry in the summer.

Demographics 
The population of Wollaston Post (Lac La Hache 220, IR, Saskatchewan) was 1,251 in 2011.

Band government 
Wollaston Post is the administrative centre of the Hatchet Lake Dene Nation. The First Nations band government had a total registered membership of 1,760 in January 2015 with 1,369 members residing on-reserve and 391 members residing at locations off-reserve. Under a Custom Electoral System members choose one Chief and six councillors. Hatchet Lake is affiliated with the Prince Albert Grand Council.

Territory
Hatchet Lake Dene Nation has one territory (Lac La Hache 220). It includes many islands the largest being Strong Island, Paul Island, Labby Island and Jackpine Island and peninsulas north of the settlement in the area surrounding Fidler Bay and Kempton Bay.

Climate
Wollaston Lake has a subarctic climate (Dfc) with mild, wet summers and long, severely cold winters.

See also 
Denesuline language
Denesuline

References 

Division No. 18, Unorganized, Saskatchewan
First Nations governments in Saskatchewan
Northern settlements in Saskatchewan
Dene communities